The 1792 United States presidential election in Pennsylvania took place as part of the 1792 United States presidential election. Pennsylvania voters chose 15 members of the Electoral College, each of whom, under the provisions of the Constitution prior to the passage of the Twelfth Amendment, cast two votes for President.

Pennsylvania unanimously voted for nonpartisan candidate and incumbent President George Washington. The total statewide popular vote comprised 3,479 for Federalist electors and 1,097 for Anti-Federalist electors, all of whom were supportive of Washington and all but one of whom supported John Adams, the incumbent Vice President; one elector voted for George Clinton.

Results

See also
 List of United States presidential elections in Pennsylvania

References

Pennsylvania
1792
1792 Pennsylvania elections